Henchir Bez is an archaeological site in Tunisia,  located at 36° 00′ 23″ N, 9° 32 in the hills overlooking the Oued Miliane river, west of Tunis. Identified by a recently discovered inscription, it is the ruins of the Roman civitas of Vazi Sarra, which include a Christian Basilica and a Byzantine/Roman fort.

Ruins
The ruins at Henchir Bez have been identified as the remains of Vazitana Sarra Civitas (Vazi Sarara), a civitas of the Roman province of Africa Proconsularis.
The remains at Henchir Bez include a Bascilica and a fort. The fort was originally a temple dedicated to Mercury Soberus.

Etymology
The name Henchir Bez means the "ruins of Bez" where 'bez' probably derives from the ancient "Vaz[i]" through Linguisitic Fortition. The name Vazitana Sarra Civitas is supported by recent epigraphical finds

Bishopric
The ancient Roman town of Vazi-Sarra was also the seat of an ancient Catholic Bishopric. It existed until the Muslim conquest of the Maghreb, and is now a titular see of the Roman Catholic Church.

Another ancient Bishopric, Marcelliana, was located nearby. However, its exact location is unknown.

References

Archaeological sites in Tunisia
Roman towns and cities in Tunisia
Ancient Berber cities
Catholic titular sees in Africa